The 148th district of the Texas House of Representatives contains northern parts of Houston. The current Representative is Penny Morales Shaw, who has represented the district since 2021.

References 

148

Texas elections